Sonny Stitt with the New Yorkers is an album by the saxophonist Sonny Stitt, recorded in 1957 and originally released on the Roost label.

Reception
The Allmusic site awarded the album 3 stars.

Track listing 
All compositions by Sonny Stitt except as indicated
 "The Best Things in Life Are Free" (Ray Henderson, Lew Brown, Buddy DeSylva) - 5:00   
 "Engos, the Bloos" - 3:40   
 "It Might As Well Be Spring" (Oscar Hammerstein II, Richard Rodgers) - 5:40   
 "Cherokee" (Ray Noble) - 4:05   
 "I Didn't Know What Time It Was" (Lorenz Hart, Rodgers) - 4:30   
 "Body and Soul" (Edward Heyman, Robert Sour, Frank Eyton, Johnny Green) – 3:52   
 "People Will Say We're In Love" (Hammerstein, Rodgers) - 4:50   
 "Bloosey" - 3:45   
 "Birds' Eye" - 4:15

Personnel 
Sonny Stitt - alto saxophone
Hank Jones - piano
Wendell Marshall - bass
Shadow Wilson - drums

References 

1957 albums
Albums produced by Teddy Reig
Roost Records albums
Sonny Stitt albums